Urophora korneyevi is a species of tephritid or fruit flies in the genus Urophora of the family Tephritidae.

Distribution 
The species is found in Ukraine.

References

Urophora
Insects described in 1999
Diptera of Europe